Nandni tunnels are the series of four highway tunnels built inside the Nandni Wildlife Sanctuary on NH44 Jammu-Srinagar National Highway in Jammu and Kashmir in India. Built between Jammu  and Udhampur cities with a combined length of 1.4 km (T1 - 210 m, T2 - 300 m, T3 - 330 m, & T4 - 540 m), the tunnels have reduced distance and travel time between Jammu and Srinagar by bypassing 6.8 km of rugged mountainous area with 3.6 km of straight bridges and tunnels. 

They were built by Afcons Infrastructure a subsidiary of the Shapoorji Pallonji Group.

See also

 India-China Border Roads & tunnels
 List of rail tunnels in India by length
 Jawahar tunnel, Banihal
 Dr. Syama Prasad Mookerjee Tunnel
 Zoji-la Tunnel
 Z-Morh Tunnel

References

Road tunnels in Jammu and Kashmir
2017 establishments in Jammu and Kashmir
Tunnels completed in 2017
Udhampur district